Ormiscus is a genus of fungus weevils in the family Anthribidae. There are at least 60 described species in Ormiscus.

Species
These 60 species belong to the genus Ormiscus:

References

Further reading

 
 
 
 
 
 
 

Anthribidae
Articles created by Qbugbot